Kang Chul (born 2 November 1971) is a former South Korean football player who played as a left-back. He played for South Korea in two Summer Olympics and two AFC Asian Cups. After retirement, he became an assistant manager under Hwang Sun-hong for a long time. In the 2013 Korean FA Cup, he was named the best manager after leading Pohang Steelers to win the final instead of Hwang who was sent off.

Career statistics

International
Results list South Korea's goal tally first.

Honours

Player 
Yonsei University
Korean President's Cup: 1989

Bucheon SK
Korean League Cup: 1994, 2000+

Jeonnam Dragons
Korean FA Cup runner-up: 2003

South Korea
AFC Asian Cup third place: 2000

Individual
K League 1 Best XI: 1999, 2000

Manager 
Individual
Korean FA Cup Best Manager: 2013

References

External links
 
 
 

1971 births
Living people
Association football defenders
South Korean footballers
South Korean expatriate footballers
South Korea international footballers
Jeju United FC players
Gimcheon Sangmu FC players
LASK players
Jeonnam Dragons players
K League 1 players
Austrian Football Bundesliga players
Expatriate footballers in Austria
1996 AFC Asian Cup players
2000 AFC Asian Cup players
2000 CONCACAF Gold Cup players
2001 FIFA Confederations Cup players
Footballers at the 1992 Summer Olympics
Footballers at the 2000 Summer Olympics
Olympic footballers of South Korea
Footballers from Seoul
South Korean expatriate sportspeople in Austria
Yonsei University alumni
FC Seoul non-playing staff
Footballers at the 1994 Asian Games
Asian Games competitors for South Korea
Daejeon Hana Citizen FC managers